A  is a type of traditional Japanese restaurant. Traditionally,  only accept new customers by referral and feature entertainment by geisha, but in modern times this is not always the case.   are typically a place where high-level business or political meetings can take place discreetly.

In Kanazawa,  compete to sell the most extravagant take-home  meals during the new year, a practice that is centuries old. 

 were common to Japanese towns no matter the size until the 1960s, when their use began to decline in favor of hotels and nightclubs as places for entwining business with entertainment.

The declining use of geisha and  have led to a relaxation of the exclusivity and secrecy used in their services, such as to advertise on the internet, post prices for services, and accepting new clientele without a reference from a well-established patron.

List 
 Kawabun in Nagoya

See also
Japanese cuisine

References

External links
"In Tokyo's Ryotei, The Art of Service", The New York Times

Restaurants in Japan
Japanese restaurants